Star 80 is a 1983 American biographical drama film written and directed by Bob Fosse. It was adapted from the Pulitzer Prize-winning Village Voice article "Death of a Playmate" by Teresa Carpenter and is based on Canadian Playboy model Dorothy Stratten, who was murdered by her husband Paul Snider in 1980. The film’s title is taken from one of Snider's vanity license plates.

The film stars Mariel Hemingway as Stratten and Eric Roberts as Snider, with supporting roles by Cliff Robertson, Carroll Baker, Roger Rees, Stuart Damon, Josh Mostel and David Clennon. The film chronicles Stratten's relationship with Snider, their move to Los Angeles, her success as a Playboy model, the dissolution of their relationship and her murder.

Star 80 was filmed on location in Vancouver, British Columbia and Los Angeles, California; the death scene was filmed in the same house in which the real murder-suicide took place. Hugh Hefner, disliking his depiction in the film, sued its producers. In accordance with the Stratten family's wishes, Stratten's mother is never mentioned by name in the film and the names of her sister and brother were changed. Other names were changed because of legal concerns.

Plot 
In 1980, Dorothy Stratten lies dead as her husband rants to himself about the events that led up to the present moment. Through a series of flashbacks that are interspersed by the murderer's rants, the story is told. Two years earlier, Stratten was working at a Dairy Queen in her hometown of Vancouver, British Columbia when she met Paul Snider, a brash small-time scam artist and pimp. Snider charms Stratten into taking him to her high-school prom. He woos Stratten with attention and flattery, convincing her to pose nude in Polaroid photographs. He tries to run Dorothy's life, threatens any other man who comes near her and insists on being her personal manager.

Snider uses the nude photographs to persuade a professional to create a portfolio for Stratten. Snider forges the signature of Stratten's mother on a consent form and sends the portfolio to Playboy. The magazine invites Stratten to Los Angeles to pose for a professional photographer.

Playboy founder and publisher Hugh Hefner makes Stratten Playmate of the Month for the August 1979 issue. Hefner provides lodging for Stratten and gives her a job as a bunny at an L.A. Playboy Club. Snider pressures Stratten into marrying him. She begins an acting career with small film and television roles and is made 1980's Playmate of the Year.

Snider purchases a new Mercedes SL with the vanity license plate STAR 80, but feels dejected after losing money on failed business ventures and being eclipsed by Stratten's success. At the Playboy Mansion, Stratten catches the eye of film director Aram Nicholas, who lets her read for a film role. Snider hires a private investigator to follow Stratten and learns that Stratten and Nicholas are sleeping together. Snider buys a shotgun after Stratten insists that she intends to leave him. Against Nicholas's wishes, Stratten meets with Snider to arrange a financial settlement. Snider pleads with Stratten not to leave him, but she says that the marriage is over. Enraged, he rapes and shoots her. As he then turns the gun on himself, the screen turns to black with the gunshot.

Cast

Production 
The idea for the project began when Bob Fosse's friend Paddy Chayefsky recommended a Pulitzer Prize-winning article about Stratten written by Teresa Carpenter that had appeared in The Village Voice. In May 1981, it was announced that Fosse was developing a screenplay, originally titled The Dorothy Stratten Story.

Mariel Hemingway believed she was ideal for the part and campaigned for it vigorously with letters, telephone messages and visits to Fosse’s home. She eventually won the role after four readings and her casting was announced in March 1982. Some in the media reported that Hemingway had undergone breast augmentation surgery to secure the part. In the 2020 documentary Skin: A History of Nudity in the Movies, Hemingway admits she did indeed have a breast-enlargement procedure before being cast, but says, "I did it for me. I wouldn't have done that because of a movie." Nude photographs of Hemingway posing as Stratten appeared in the January 1984 issue of Playboy magazine.

According to Fosse, he had to persuade Eric Roberts to play the role of Paul Snider, a character whom Roberts considered unlikeable. Early media speculation suggested that Harry Dean Stanton might be cast as Playboy publisher Hugh Hefner, but Cliff Robertson was later reported to be researching the role by visiting Hefner's mansion. The film was Carroll Baker's first Hollywood production since her 1967 return from Europe.

Director Peter Bogdanovich, Stratten's boyfriend at the time of her murder, expressed opposition to the project, arguing that Fosse "didn’t know the true story." Fosse acknowledged this to be true but countered that the film was actually about Snider. Bogdanovich refused to allow his name to be used in the film and threatened to sue if he found the character of Aram Nicholas to be objectionable. He provided his opinions of the film in his 1984 biography of Stratten, The Killing of the Unicorn: Dorothy Stratten, 1960-1980, but did not pursue legal action.

Preproduction began in Stratten’s hometown of Vancouver in January 1982. Sets were created to represent Stratten’s bedroom, high-school gymnasium and the Dairy Queen where she had met Snider. After Hefner refused to allow filming at his estate, an unoccupied mansion in Pasadena was renovated to resemble that of Hefner. After the film's release, Hefner expressed disappointment, describing it as "too shallow." The film's party scenes show actual Playboy models.

Principal photography began on July 6, 1982 in Vancouver and continued for four months, including four weeks in Vancouver and 12 weeks in Los Angeles, and finished three days ahead of schedule.

Star 80 is the second film based on the murder of Stratten, preceded by the 1981 television film Death of a Centerfold: The Dorothy Stratten Story, with Jamie Lee Curtis as Stratten and Bruce Weitz as Snider.

The film was dedicated to Fosse's longtime friend Paddy Chayefsky who died two years before the film.

Release and reception 
The film opened in 16 theaters in major cities on November 10, 1983, grossing $233,313 on its opening weekend. Warner Bros. planned to release the film to more theaters for the Christmas season and to give it a wide release in time for the next Academy Awards ceremony. Eventually, the film grossed $6,472,990 domestically and was shown at a peak of 502 theaters in early 1984. Star 80 has an 81% approval rating on Rotten Tomatoes based on 16 reviews, with an average rating of 7.4/10. On Metacritic it has a weighted average score 63% based on reviews from 13 critics, indicating "generally favorable reviews."

Critical reception to the film was generally mixed, but it was praised for Hemingway’s and Roberts's performances. Roberts won the Boston Society of Film Critics Award for Best Actor and was nominated for the Golden Globe Award for Best Actor – Motion Picture Drama. Fosse was nominated for the Golden Bear award at the Berlin Film Festival. Star 80 marked Fosse's final film as director before his death in 1987.

The film was screened out of competition at the 34th Berlin International Film Festival. The Washington Post called it "Bob Fosse's latest stylish stinker." Gene Siskel of The Chicago Tribune placed the film on his list of the ten best films of 1983, though acknowledging that the film was very unpleasant.

Chicago Sun-Times critic Roger Ebert awarded the film four out of four stars and deemed it an "important movie." Appearing with Siskel on an October 1986 edition of The Late Show Starring Joan Rivers, Ebert said that Roberts should have been nominated for an Oscar for his work on Star 80. Ebert coined the phrase "Star 80 syndrome" after claiming that Gary Oldman's performance as Sid Vicious in Sid and Nancy was snubbed for the same reason as was Roberts: "Hollywood will not nominate an actor for portraying a creep, no matter how good the performance is."

Accolades

References

External links 
 
 
 

1983 films
1983 drama films
American biographical drama films
American independent films
Drama films based on actual events
Films directed by Bob Fosse
Films about domestic violence
Films about death
Murder–suicide in films
Films set in the 1970s
Films set in 1980
Films set in Vancouver
The Ladd Company films
Films about Playboy
Biographical films about models
Necrophilia in film
1980s English-language films
1980s American films